Ade, Adé, or ADE may refer to:

Aeronautics
Ada Air's ICAO code
Aden International Airport's IATA code
Aeronautical Development Establishment, a laboratory of the DRDO in India

Medical
Adverse Drug Event
Antibody-dependent enhancement
ADE (chemotherapy), a chemotherapy regimen consisting of Ara-C (cytarabine), Daunorubicin and Etoposide

People
Ade (given name)
Ade (surname)
Adé (singer)

Places
Adé, Chad, a city in Chad
Adé, Hautes-Pyrénées, a commune in France
Ade, Indiana, an unincorporated place in the US
Ade, Maharashtra, a small village in Maharashtra state, India

Other uses
Acoustic droplet ejection
Ade (drink suffix)
ADE classification, a mathematics classification
Adele language, a Niger-Congo language of Ghana and Togo
Algebraic differential equation, a kind of differential equation
Amsterdam Dance Event, an electronic music conference and club festival
Adenine, a nucleobase
Adobe Digital Editions
Application Development Environment
Arizona Department of Education
Atlantis Diesel Engines

See also
AdeS, an Indonesian bottled water brand
Ada (disambiguation)
ADA (disambiguation)